Edward Stothard (16 November 1893–1955) was an English footballer who played in the Football League for South Shields.

References

1893 births
1955 deaths
English footballers
Association football midfielders
English Football League players
Gateshead A.F.C. players
West Stanley F.C. players